Ralph Samuel Thomas is a Jamaican banker, academic and diplomat who served as Jamaican ambassador to China, United States and the Permanent Representative of Jamaica to the Organization of American States (OAS). He previously served in several Jamaican government agencies including Urban Development Corporation and Jamaica Financial Services Authority as Director. Thomas ran for a North Central Clarendon seat in the Jamaican parliament on the ticket of the People's National Party in 2007 but lost.

Education 
Thomas attended Glenmuir High School and obtained his first degree in arts (General) Degree from the University of the West Indies in 1976. In 1990, he earned a master's degree in Business Administration at the Columbia University and received Financial Analysis and Policy training from the International Monetary Fund Institute.

Career 
Thomas began his career in banking with the Bank of New York in 1981 and rose to the position of vice president and regional manager in 2003. He left the bank in 2004 and started working as an independent consultant in the banking industry. In 2010, he became a senior teaching fellow in the Mona School of Business and Management and later held directorship positions at the National Insurance Fund Board, Jamaica Financial Services Authority, Urban Development Corporation, and the Mental Health Association of Westchester in New York and was chairman of the Micro Investment Development Agency, a micro credit lending agency.

In 2013, he was appointed Jamaican ambassador to China with residence in Beijing. He served concurrently as Jamaican non-resident ambassador to Vietnam and the Democratic People's Republic of Korea. During this period, he also served as Jamaican non-resident high commissioner to Bangladesh, Pakistan and Singapore. On 8 September 2015, Thomas was redeployed from China to the United States as ambassador and permanent representative to the Organization of American States replacing Stephen Vasciannie.

References 

Jamaican diplomats
Jamaican bankers
Jamaican academics
University of the West Indies alumni
Columbia Business School alumni
Year of birth missing (living people)
Living people